Roger Grenfell Toulson, Lord Toulson, PC (23 September 1946 – 27 June 2017) was a British lawyer and judge who served as a Justice of the Supreme Court of the United Kingdom.

Education
He was educated at Mill Hill School, to which he won the top scholarship for his year and was one of the most talented pupils, taking 'O' levels at 13, 'A' levels in Greek, Latin and Ancient History at 15, and breaking the school record for the mile at 16, at which age he left to go to Jesus College, Cambridge (MA, LLB), of which he later became an honorary fellow, before being called to the Bar by the Inner Temple in 1969.

Career
He joined the Western Circuit in 1970, and became a Queen's Counsel in 1986. In 1996 he became a judge of the High Court of Justice, sitting in the Queen's Bench Division, receiving the customary knighthood. From 2002 to 2006 he sat as Chairman of the Law Commission of England and Wales. On 29 January 2007, he was promoted to the Court of Appeal, sworn of the Privy Council and appointed to the Judicial Appointments Commission.

Toulson was appointed as a Justice of the Supreme Court of the United Kingdom on 9 April 2013. By Royal Warrant, all members of the Supreme Court, even if they do not hold a peerage, are entitled to the judicial style and title "Lord" for life. Toulson was granted the judicial courtesy title Lord Toulson. He retired from the court on 22 September 2016.

As a judge Toulson was opposed to judicial interference in Government action. He expressed the view that "all human life is experimental, all forms of government are experimental. I think it would be a retrograde step if the courts, in the name of rights, prevent governments of whichever hue from engaging in legitimate social experimentation."

Toulson was the co-author of a textbook on the English law of confidentiality.

He died on 27 June 2017 at the age of 70, while in hospital for heart surgery.

Notable judicial decisions
Lord Toulson was involved in a number of notable decisions during his time as a judge.

Other notable judicial decisions of Lord Toulson included:
 
 
  
 
 
 
 
 

In Kennedy v Charity Commission [2014], Lord Toulson said famously: “it was not the purpose of the Human Rights Act that the common law should become an ossuary”.

He expressed the view that certain information about the private life of a celebrity had become so widely available that it could no longer be sensibly protected by injunctive relief, observing, "The court must live in the world as it is and not as it would like it to be."

References

1946 births
2017 deaths
Judges of the Supreme Court of the United Kingdom
Members of the Privy Council of the United Kingdom
People educated at Mill Hill School
Alumni of Jesus College, Cambridge
Fellows of Jesus College, Cambridge
Knights Bachelor
20th-century King's Counsel
English King's Counsel
Members of the Judicial Committee of the Privy Council